Pierre and Djemila is a 1987 French drama film directed by Gérard Blain. It was entered into the 1987 Cannes Film Festival.

Cast
In alphabetical order
 Abdelkader - Djaffar
 Djedjigua Ait-Hamouda - Aicha
 Jean-Pierre André - Pierre Landry
 Jacques Brunet - Pere De Pierre
 Fatia Cheeba - Houria
 Fatiha Cheriguene - Mere de Djemila
 Francine Debaisieux - Mere De Pierre
 Séverine Debaisieux - Carole
 Abdelkader Djerouni - Imam
 Lakhdar Kasri - Lakhdar
 Svetlana Novak - Professeur De Mathematiques
 Nadja Reski - Djemila Khodja
 Salah Teskouk - Pere de Djemila

References

External links

1987 films
French drama films
1980s French-language films
1987 drama films
Films directed by Gérard Blain
1980s French films